Madhyam is the fourth svara from the seven svaras of Hindustani music and Carnatic music. This article is written from the Hindustani perspective. Madhyam is the long form of the syllable म. For simplicity in pronouncing while singing the syllable, Madhyam is pronounced as Ma (notation - M). It is also called as मध्यम in the Devanagri script.

Details
The following is the information about Madhyam and its importance in Indian classical music :

 Madhyam is the fourth svara in an octave or Saptak.
 Ma is the immediate next svara of Gandhar (Ga).
In fact Madhyam is the only  svara in the Saptak.
 It is said that Shadja is the basic svara from which all the other six svaras are produced. Breaking the word Shadja yields Shad And Ja. It means that Shad is six and ja is 'giving birth' in Marathi. So basically the translation is :
  षड् - 6, ज -जन्म . Therefore, it collectively means giving birth to the other six notes of the music.
So the svara Ma is formed from Shadja.
 There are 4 Shruti's of Madhyam. Previously the main Shruti not only for Ma but for all the other svaras was on the last Shruti but now it is considered to be on the 1st Shurti.
For example if these are the 4 Shruti's of Ma then,

                       Previously this was the position of the main Shruti of Ma.
                        ^ 
              1   2  3  4
              ^
              But now this position has become the main Shruti of Ma.

 All the other svaras except Shadja (Sa) and Pancham (Pa) can be  or  svaras but Sa and Pa are always Shuddha svaras. And hence svaras Sa and Pa are called Achal Svaras, since these svaras don't move from their original position. Svaras Ra, Ga, Ma, Dha, Ni are called Chal Svaras, since these svaras move from their original position.
    
     Sa, Re, Ga, Ma, Pa, Dha, Ni - Shuddha Svaras
    
     Re, Ga, Dha, Ni -  Svaras 
   
     Ma -  Svaras

Ma is a Shuddha Svara as well as a Tivra Svara. But Ma is the only Tivra Svara out of the seven svaras. This is denoted as म॓ .

 Ragas from Kalyan Thaat, Poorvi Thaat, Marwa Thaat, Todi Thaat have Tivra Madhyam, rest of the thaats have Shuddha Madhyam.
 Ragas where Ma is the Vadi svara - Raga Kedar, etc. Ragas where Ma is the Samvadi svara - Raga Malkauns.
 Hypothetically speaking, Ma is said to be the Mahipal - Lord Indra, Mahipal as in, the three main gods, Bhrama, Vishnu and Shiva were first created i.e. Sakar Bhrama (Sa) and then these three gods created Rishimuni i.e. Re and then Gandharvas were created for singing and then lord Indra or Raja Indra i.e. Mahipal was created. Ma is made the acronym of Mahipal for showing the importance of the syllable Ma.
 Madhyam is said to be sourced from call of the heron.
 Madhyam is associated with the planet Moon.
 Madhyam is associated with White colour.

See also
 List of Ragas in Hindustani classical music
 Svara
 Shadja (Sa)
 Rishabh (Re)
 Gandhar (Ga)
 Pancham (Pa)
 Dhaivat (Dha)
 Nishad (Ni)

Ma (svara)

References

Hindustani music
Carnatic music